DC3 Music Group is a multi-media company, specialised in filming live concerts and behind the scenes contents. It was formed in 2008 by Daniel Catullo, director and producer, Peter Bowers, and Brian Lisi, mobile executive.

The company's first project was Live from Amsterdam by Alter Bridge. Shot in December 2008 the Heineken Music Hall in Amsterdam, the DVD was directed by Daniel Catullo and was released on Amazon.com in 2009. In the past three years the company has produced many projects for artists such as Godsmack, Creed, Chickenfoot, Rage Against the Machine, Staind, Alter Bridge, Slash, Guns N' Roses, Three Days Grace, Stone Temple Pilots, 3 Doors Down, Daughtry, and many others.  The company is distributed in the US by EMI, E-1 in Canada, RSK in the UK, EMI in parts of Europe, Edel AG in Italy, Roadrunner in Europe, and Soulfood in Germany.

Philanthropy
DC3 and its staff are active in supporting various charities, most notably ones for Haiti. The trip was known as Plane to Haiti and DC3 enlisted the support of many artists they work with for this mission, including Godsmack, David Archuleta, Julianne Hough, New Kids on the Block, Scott Stapp, Alter Bridge, and others. They partnered with the Wheelchair Foundation, Medishare, and Partners in Heath. They transported over 35 medical professionals to Haiti and set up their own medical clinics and treated over 1,000 patients. They were one of the first relief groups to go to Leogone, where the epicenter was only 7 days after the earthquake that struck Haiti in early 2010.

DC3 is a major supporter of the Wheelchair Foundation, Creative Visions and the Global Adolescent Project. Their staff regularly makes trips to third world countries on relief missions and they often raise money to support these charities.

World Record
In 2009 DC3 Music Group produced the DVD Creed Live. The show was aired to United States military troops all over the world on the American Forces Network. DC3 was awarded four Guinness World Records for this show, the most notable one for the most cameras used in a live concert recording. DC3 used a total of 249 HD cameras to capture the show. The previous record was Justin Timberlake at Madison Square Garden with 47 cameras. There was an adjudicator on hand to certify the number of cameras and present the award to the band and the DC3 team on stage in front of over 20,000 fans after the show.  The show was produced by Peter Bowers and Lionel Pasamonte, and directed by Daniel Catullo.

Partial filmography
 2010: 4 Guinness World Records for Creed Live DVD 
 2009: Platinum Award US for Nickelback “Live from Sturgis”
 2009: Platinum Award Canada for Nickelback “Live from Sturgis”
 2008: Gold Award US for Smashing Pumpkins “ If All Goes Wrong”
 2008: Gold Award US and Canada for Steve Miller Band - Live From Chicago
 2008: 7× Platinum Award US for “Rush In Rio”
 2007 and 2008: 2× Platinum Award US for “Godsmack - Changes”
 2007: Gold Award US for “Duran Duran Live From London”
 2006: Classic Rock Mag Award for “Music DVD Of The Year” -Whitesnake Live
 2006: Platinum Award for “Duran Duran - Live From London” in the U.S.
 2005: 6× Platinum Award from the RIAA for “Rush In Rio” in the U.S.
 2005: Gold Award for “Boz Scaggs Greatest Hits Live” in the US
 2004: Grammy Nomination - “Rush In Rio”
 2004: Golden Eagle Cine Award - “Gloria Estefan - Live & Unwrapped”
 2004: JUNO Award - Music DVD Of The Year - "Rush In Rio"
 2004: Telly Award - “Best TV Or Cable Program/Live Event” Matchbox Twenty

References

Entertainment companies of the United States